Gordon Ramsay is a British chef, restaurateur, writer, television personality and food critic. He currently owns and/or operates restaurants across Europe, North America and Asia.

Ramsay founded his first restaurant chain, Gordon Ramsay Restaurants, in 1997. He has owned and operated a series of restaurants since he first became head chef of Aubergine in 1993. He owned 25% of that restaurant, where he earned his first two Michelin stars. Following the dismissal of protege Marcus Wareing from sister restaurant L'Oranger, Ramsay organised a staff walkout from both restaurants and subsequently took them to open up Restaurant Gordon Ramsay, at Royal Hospital Road, London. His self-titled restaurant went on to become his first and only three Michelin star restaurant.

Ramsay has installed a number of proteges in restaurants. Both Angela Hartnett and Jason Atherton worked at Verre before moving back to London to The Connaught and Maze respectively. Atherton left to open his own restaurant, and Hartnett purchased Murano from Ramsay in 2010. Wareing was made head chef of London based restaurant, Pétrus. It went on to win two Michelin stars, but in 2008 the two chefs fell out when Wareing kept the restaurant premises and the stars, while Ramsay received rights to the name. The restaurant was renamed Marcus Wareing at the Berkeley, while in 2010 the new Pétrus by Gordon Ramsay was opened.

Ramsay launched a series of Hell's Kitchen-themed restaurants based on the show he's hosted. The first Gordon Ramsay Hell's Kitchen restaurant location opened in front of Caesars Palace on the Las Vegas Strip in January 2018. Ramsay has also created other chains.

Restaurants

See also
 Lists of restaurants

Notes

Footnotes

References

External links
Gordon Ramsay official website
Gordon Ramsay Restaurants official website

Gordon Ramsay
Michelin Guide starred restaurants